The Nenets Constituency (No. 221) is a Russian legislative constituency in the Nenets Autonomous Okrug. The constituency is the only one in Nenets Autonomous Okrug, and occupies the whole of its territory.

Members elected

Election results

1993

|-
! colspan=2 style="background-color:#E9E9E9;text-align:left;vertical-align:top;" |Candidate
! style="background-color:#E9E9E9;text-align:left;vertical-align:top;" |Party
! style="background-color:#E9E9E9;text-align:right;" |Votes
! style="background-color:#E9E9E9;text-align:right;" |%
|-
|style="background-color:#EA3C38"|
|align=left|Artur Chilingarov
|align=left|Civic Union
|10,184
|56.20%
|-
|style="background-color:"|
|align=left|Anatoly Koltunov
|align=left|Independent
| -
|12.70%
|-
| colspan="5" style="background-color:#E9E9E9;"|
|- style="font-weight:bold"
| colspan="3" style="text-align:left;" | Total
| 18,120
| 100%
|-
| colspan="5" style="background-color:#E9E9E9;"|
|- style="font-weight:bold"
| colspan="4" |Source:
|
|}

1995

|-
! colspan=2 style="background-color:#E9E9E9;text-align:left;vertical-align:top;" |Candidate
! style="background-color:#E9E9E9;text-align:left;vertical-align:top;" |Party
! style="background-color:#E9E9E9;text-align:right;" |Votes
! style="background-color:#E9E9E9;text-align:right;" |%
|-
|style="background-color:#DA2021"|
|align=left|Artur Chilingarov (incumbent)
|align=left|Ivan Rybkin Bloc
|12,548
|58.63%
|-
|style="background-color:"|
|align=left|Mikhail Shipilov
|align=left|Agrarian Party
|3,246
|15.17%
|-
|style="background-color:"|
|align=left|Aleksey Churilov
|align=left|Liberal Democratic Party
|2,009
|9.39%
|-
|style="background-color:"|
|align=left|Olga Terletskaya
|align=left|Independent
|555
|2.59%
|-
|style="background-color:"|
|align=left|Filipp Ardeev
|align=left|Independent
|417
|1.95%
|-
|style="background-color:"|
|align=left|Nikolay Vlasov
|align=left|Independent
|244
|1.14%
|-
|style="background-color:#000000"|
|colspan=2 |against all
|1,923
|8.99%
|-
| colspan="5" style="background-color:#E9E9E9;"|
|- style="font-weight:bold"
| colspan="3" style="text-align:left;" | Total
| 21,402
| 100%
|-
| colspan="5" style="background-color:#E9E9E9;"|
|- style="font-weight:bold"
| colspan="4" |Source:
|
|}

1999

|-
! colspan=2 style="background-color:#E9E9E9;text-align:left;vertical-align:top;" |Candidate
! style="background-color:#E9E9E9;text-align:left;vertical-align:top;" |Party
! style="background-color:#E9E9E9;text-align:right;" |Votes
! style="background-color:#E9E9E9;text-align:right;" |%
|-
|style="background-color:#3B9EDF"|
|align=left|Artur Chilingarov (incumbent)
|align=left|Fatherland – All Russia
|9,941
|47.13%
|-
|style="background-color:"|
|align=left|Andrey Vavilov
|align=left|Independent
|3,170
|15.03%
|-
|style="background-color:"|
|align=left|Yury Romanov
|align=left|Independent
|2,321
|11.00%
|-
|style="background-color:"|
|align=left|Elek Rybak
|align=left|Independent
|1,433
|6.79%
|-
|style="background-color:"|
|align=left|Igor Koshin
|align=left|Independent
|831
|3.94%
|-
|style="background-color:"|
|align=left|Aleksandr Sidorov
|align=left|Independent
|478
|2.27%
|-
|style="background-color:"|
|align=left|Vladimir Yanzinov
|align=left|Yabloko
|349
|1.65%
|-
|style="background-color:"|
|align=left|Viktor Fomin
|align=left|Independent
|219
|1.04%
|-
|style="background-color:"|
|align=left|Boris Borodkin
|align=left|Independent
|198
|0.94%
|-
|style="background-color:"|
|align=left|Konstantin Sochnev
|align=left|Independent
|130
|0.62%
|-
|style="background-color:"|
|align=left|Aleksey Kapustin
|align=left|Independent
|52
|0.25%
|-
|style="background-color:#084284"|
|align=left|Yury Gudzhabidze
|align=left|Spiritual Heritage
|28
|0.13%
|-
|style="background-color:"|
|align=left|Rafel Khudaverdiev
|align=left|Independent
|21
|0.10%
|-
|style="background-color:"|
|align=left|Sergey Perov
|align=left|Independent
|14
|0.07%
|-
|style="background-color:#000000"|
|colspan=2 |against all
|1,515
|7.18%
|-
| colspan="5" style="background-color:#E9E9E9;"|
|- style="font-weight:bold"
| colspan="3" style="text-align:left;" | Total
| 21,093
| 100%
|-
| colspan="5" style="background-color:#E9E9E9;"|
|- style="font-weight:bold"
| colspan="4" |Source:
|
|}

2003

|-
! colspan=2 style="background-color:#E9E9E9;text-align:left;vertical-align:top;" |Candidate
! style="background-color:#E9E9E9;text-align:left;vertical-align:top;" |Party
! style="background-color:#E9E9E9;text-align:right;" |Votes
! style="background-color:#E9E9E9;text-align:right;" |%
|-
|style="background-color:"|
|align=left|Artur Chilingarov (incumbent)
|align=left|United Russia
|8,319
|47.79%
|-
|style="background-color:"|
|align=left|Vyacheslav Korepanov
|align=left|Independent
|4,032
|21.22%
|-
|style="background-color:"|
|align=left|Elek Rybak
|align=left|Independent
|2,370
|12.47%
|-
|style="background-color:"|
|align=left|Yury Romanov
|align=left|Communist Party
|901
|4.74%
|-
|style="background-color:"|
|align=left|Vladislav Peskov
|align=left|Independent
|648
|3.41%
|-
|style="background-color:"|
|align=left|Dmitry Ruzhnikov
|align=left|Independent
|586
|3.08%
|-
|style="background-color:"|
|align=left|Andrey Ruzhnikov
|align=left|Independent
|437
|2.30%
|-
|style="background-color:"|
|align=left|Sergey Sultanov
|align=left|Independent
|60
|0.32%
|-
|style="background-color:#000000"|
|colspan=2 |against all
|1,437
|7.56%
|-
| colspan="5" style="background-color:#E9E9E9;"|
|- style="font-weight:bold"
| colspan="3" style="text-align:left;" | Total
| 19,008
| 100%
|-
| colspan="5" style="background-color:#E9E9E9;"|
|- style="font-weight:bold"
| colspan="4" |Source:
|
|}

2016

|-
! colspan=2 style="background-color:#E9E9E9;text-align:left;vertical-align:top;" |Candidate
! style="background-color:#E9E9E9;text-align:left;vertical-align:top;" |Party
! style="background-color:#E9E9E9;text-align:right;" |Votes
! style="background-color:#E9E9E9;text-align:right;" |%
|-
|style="background-color:"|
|align=left|Sergey Kotkin
|align=left|United Russia
|5,862
|45.30%
|-
|style="background-color:"|
|align=left|Aleksandr Sablin
|align=left|Communist Party
|3,491
|26.98%
|-
|style="background-color:"|
|align=left|Andrey Smychenkov
|align=left|Liberal Democratic Party
|1,436
|11.10%
|-
|style="background-color:"|
|align=left|Viktor Shustrov
|align=left|A Just Russia
|1,045
|8.08%
|-
|style="background-color:"|
|align=left|Natalia Soluyanova
|align=left|Rodina
|452
|3.49%
|-
|style="background:#E62020;"| 
|align=left|Aleksey Lebedev
|align=left|Communists of Russia
|212
|1.64%
|-
| colspan="5" style="background-color:#E9E9E9;"|
|- style="font-weight:bold"
| colspan="3" style="text-align:left;" | Total
| 12,940
| 100%
|-
| colspan="5" style="background-color:#E9E9E9;"|
|- style="font-weight:bold"
| colspan="4" |Source:
|
|}

2021

|-
! colspan=2 style="background-color:#E9E9E9;text-align:left;vertical-align:top;" |Candidate
! style="background-color:#E9E9E9;text-align:left;vertical-align:top;" |Party
! style="background-color:#E9E9E9;text-align:right;" |Votes
! style="background-color:#E9E9E9;text-align:right;" |%
|-
|style="background-color:"|
|align=left|Sergey Kotkin (incumbent)
|align=left|United Russia
|5,072
|39.57%
|-
|style="background-color:"|
|align=left|Mikhail Rayn
|align=left|Communist Party
|4,580
|35.73%
|-
|style="background-color: " |
|align=left|Andrey Smychenkov
|align=left|Liberal Democratic Party
|878
|6.85%
|-
|style="background-color:"|
|align=left|Dmitry Nikitin
|align=left|The Greens
|841
|6.56%
|-
|style="background-color:"|
|align=left|Oleg Breskalenko
|align=left|A Just Russia — For Truth
|647
|5.05%
|-
|style="background-color:"|
|align=left|Nikolay Milovsky
|align=left|Communists of Russia
|367
|2.86%
|-
| colspan="5" style="background-color:#E9E9E9;"|
|- style="font-weight:bold"
| colspan="3" style="text-align:left;" | Total
| 12,819
| 100%
|-
| colspan="5" style="background-color:#E9E9E9;"|
|- style="font-weight:bold"
| colspan="4" |Source:
|
|}

Notes

References

Russian legislative constituencies
Politics of the Nenets Autonomous Okrug